Leila McKinnon (born 28 September 1972) is an Australian journalist and television presenter. She is a reporter and fill in presenter for Nine News and A Current Affair. She is currently co-hosting Australian Ninja Warrior and has previously been co-host of Weekend Today.

Personal life 

McKinnon was born in Iran to an English mother and a New Zealand father, while her father was working as service manager to the late Shah of Iran's fleet of vehicles. She grew up in Brisbane, where she attended MacGregor State High School.

In 2012, McKinnon gave birth to her first child. McKinnon's second child was born in 2014.

Career 
McKinnon began her career reporting part-time for The Sunday Telegraph in Brisbane, while finishing a journalism degree at Queensland University of Technology. In 1993 she accepted a cadetship at WIN Television in Rockhampton, Queensland, before moving to WIN's Cairns bureau. In 1995, she began work with the Nine Network, reporting and presenting for Nine Gold Coast News.

After three years she became a reporter for A Current Affair in Brisbane. A brief stint on a short-lived consumer affairs programme followed, before she moved to Sydney and returned to the news department, in late 2001. In February 2005, she was appointed news presenter for Today replacing Sharyn Ghidella. She remained news presenter of Today until June when Ghidella was reinstated as news presenter. In August, she returned to present National Nine Morning News presenting the morning bulletin.

In March 2006, she relocated to Los Angeles with her husband, Australian businessman David Gyngell.

In 2007, McKinnon returned to Australia, as her husband David Gyngell was reappointed as the CEO of the Nine Network. Since then she has presented the summer edition of A Current Affair. In 2008, she also regularly filled in on Nine News Morning Edition and Nine News Afternoon Edition. McKinnon is most famous for her interrogation of Corey Worthington in 2008. In January 2009, it was announced that McKinnon will co-host Weekend Today alongside Cameron Williams, with Amber Sherlock and Michael Slater presenting the news and sport. The program began in early February, and was introduced to counteract Seven's Weekend Sunrise. The show later extended to Saturday mornings as well. She presented the show from Victoria the morning after Black Saturday, Australia's mostly deadly bushfires. In December 2009, she co-hosted the Sydney New Year's Eve telecast alongside Cameron Williams.

In 2012 McKinnon co-hosted Nine's award-winning coverage of the London Olympic Games and conducted the first live interview with Princes William and Harry. In 2011 and 2012 she wrote a weekly rugby league column for NRL.com. McKinnon is the editor of Australia's Favorite Recipes (2012), a cookbook which raises money for the charity Legacy and features the family recipes of ordinary Australians.

In 2014, McKinnon resigned from Weekend Today to focus on other projects on the Nine Network, she was replaced by Deborah Knight.

In May 2017, McKinnon and Nine News journalist Neil Breen teamed up to host The Way It Was, a podcast which dissected the weekly news cycle.

In 2022, McKinnon was announced as one of the new hosts for the sixth season of Australian Ninja Warrior alongside Jim Courier and sideline presenters Will & Woody.

References

External links 
 Sydney Morning Herald report on wedding to David Gyngell, December 2004

Australian journalists
Australian television presenters
Australian people of English descent
Australian people of Scottish descent
Australian people of New Zealand descent
Living people
People from Tehran
1972 births
Queensland University of Technology alumni